Děčany is a municipality and village in Litoměřice District in the Ústí nad Labem Region of the Czech Republic. It has about 400 inhabitants.

Administrative parts
Villages of Lukohořany, Semeč and Solany are administrative parts of Děčany.

References

Villages in Litoměřice District